Feurs is a commune in the department of Loire, Auvergne-Rhône-Alpes, France.

History

Antiquity
The city was founded by the Romans. The name Feurs is a contraction of Segusiavorum Forum. With a forum the Gallo-Roman era, city was the capital of Ségusiaves as is indicated by Ptolemy and appears on the Tabula Peutingeriana.  By extension, the city gave its name to Forez.

Vestiges of the ancient Roman city are located by the current post office. Archaeologists have  unearthed a theater, sewers, milestones, inscriptions, statuettes and pottery that reflect the importance, at that time, of the Roman the town, located near important Roman roads.

Middle Ages 
A church dedicated to St. Baudile is reported in 960. A second dedicated to the Virgin Mary appears in the texts in 1001. A Castle in Feurs is reported in 1246.
In the Middle Ages, the city had no bridge over the Loire but there was a harbor(953) and another close to Randans (1060).

Early modern age 
Feurs with the Forez County is forfeited to the Constable of Bourbon along with his other possessions in 1523. It finally enters the royal domain in 1531. In 1542, the city is attached to the generality of Lyon, created by Henry II .

French Revolution
The French Revolution was very active in the town and the horrors of the guillotine marked its inhabitants. During the Revolution, the Revolutionary Court headed by Claude Javogues made many victims. The 80 victims of the Revolutionary Court were almost all executed at the site of the Chapel of the Martyrs. The chapel of the martyrs was erected later by Mayor Pierre-Marie Assier in 1826. It was for a short time capital of the Loire department in 1793-1795.

The town was on one of the first railways: line 3 of France Andrezieux - Roanne opened  1 August 1832 between Saint-Bonnet-les-Oules and Balbigny. This is in Feurs that from this section that are installed the workshops of the company that will build more locomotives under the orders of Régnié engineer.

The sites of archaeological interest are many but all are discovered during the various works in the municipality.

The city gave its name to the Forez province in which it is located.

Feurs was the capital of the Loire department from 1793 to 1795, during the French Revolution.

Geography
The river Lignon du Forez flows into the Loire in the commune.

Feurs is located in the Forez plain, between the Monts du Lyonnais to the East and the Monts du Forez to the West.

Economy
Over 300 small and medium enterprises are settled in Feurs and account for about 3200 jobs, distributed as follows: tertiary sector (1675), metal industry (1280), construction (267).

Leisure 
The city offers an Olympic-size swimming pool and horse racetracks, as well as playing fields for soccer, rugby and basketball.

Inhabitant from Feurs can also easily access hiking trails towards the "Monts du Forez" or "Monts du Lyonnais".

Mayors

 1855 - 1865 Auguste Broutin Parti de l'Ordre
 1878 - 1881 C Pariat     
 1881 - 1891 Jean-Marie Nigay     
 1891 - 1896 Félix Nigay     
 1896 - 1900 Charles Dorian     
 1900 - 1904 Joseph Ory     
 1904 - 1908 Joannès Mollon     
 1908 - 1912 Joseph Ory     
 1912 - 1940 Antoine Drivet
 1940 - 1944 Charles Maxime Geny 
 1953 - 1974 Félix Nigay
 1974 - 1977 Maurice Desplaces   
 1977 - 2001 André Delorme   
 2001 - 2008 Benoît Gardet   
 2008 - 2022 Jean-Pierre Taite
 2022 - Marianne Darfeuille

Population

Landmarks
 Museum of Archaeology Assier, 3 rue Victor de Laprade
 The Chapel of the Martyrs, built in memory of the victims guillotined during the Revolution of 1789. People were guillotined and shot there.
 The "font that rains" fountain whose origin is lost in the mists of time. A source of carbonated water is mentioned by Auguste Broutin in his History of the town of Feurs and its surrounding book in the neighborhood of the way of four.
 The Roman Forum instead of the position (remains)
 The Jacquemart church Our Lady of Feurs

Twin towns
Feurs and the town of Olching in Bavaria, Germany, have been twin towns since August 1963, when a delegation of 24 Foréziens, led by the mayor Félix Nigay, visited their German counterparts for the first time.

Personalities
 Joseph-Guichard Du Verney (1648-1730), anatomist
 Franck Montagny, Formula 1 driver

See also
Communes of the Loire department

References

External links
 Official site
 Gazetteer entry
 usfeurs.fr

Communes of Loire (department)
Segusiavi
Gallia Lugdunensis
Forez